Kevin Hal Reynolds (born January 17, 1952) is an American film director and screenwriter. He directed Robin Hood: Prince of Thieves, Waterworld, The Count of Monte Cristo, the cult classic Fandango, and the 2016 film Risen. He was nominated for a Primetime Emmy Award for the History miniseries Hatfields & McCoys.

Early life
Reynolds was born in San Antonio, Texas, the son of former Baylor University President Herbert H. Reynolds.

Career
Reynolds enjoyed initial successes co-writing the Cold War hit Red Dawn in 1984 and writing and directing the Steven Spielberg-produced Fandango in 1985.

He began a long friendship with Kevin Costner after hiring him for Fandango, when Costner was a little-known actor. Reynolds later advised Costner behind the scenes for the epic western Dances with Wolves (1990), in particular with the buffalo hunting scenes, on which Reynolds was also an uncredited second unit director. Costner would again be his leading man in Robin Hood: Prince of Thieves (1991). Costner then produced Reynolds' 1994 film Rapa-Nui.

Costner brought on Reynolds to direct the post-apocalyptic film Waterworld (1995). Mid-way through filming, production problems led to conflict between them. It was reported Reynolds walked away near the end of post-production, leaving star/producer Costner to supervise the completion of editing. The two friends stopped speaking; Reynolds was later quoted as having said of Costner: "Kevin should only star in movies he directs. That way he can work with his favorite actor and director". Later, Reynolds and Costner reunited to record a commentary track for the extended special edition DVD of Robin Hood: Prince of Thieves.

Reynolds next directed the dramatic thriller One Eight Seven (1997), which gave Samuel L. Jackson his first top-billed leading role. More recent directorial efforts were two classical adaptations: The Count of Monte Cristo in 2002 and Tristan & Isolde in 2006.

Reynolds directed Costner again in the History miniseries Hatfields & McCoys in 2012. The miniseries was nominated for 16 Primetime Emmy Awards, including one for Reynolds for directing.

In 2013, Reynolds was brought aboard as director for the planned project The Resurrection of Jesus Christ, a film intended as a mystery/thriller and "unofficial sequel" to The Passion of the Christ, depicting the days following Christ's resurrection, with a script written by Paul Aiello. The film is told from the viewpoint of a Roman Tribune, ordered by Pontius Pilate to investigate growing rumors of a risen Jewish messiah, and to locate the missing body of Jesus of Nazareth in order to quell an imminent uprising in Jerusalem. Eventually titled Risen, the film was released in 2016.

Filmography

Film 

Second unit director
 White Water Summer (1987)

Television

References

External links

1952 births
Living people
People from Waco, Texas
Baylor University alumni
Screenwriters from Texas
Film directors from Texas